Venegasia is a genus of North American plants in the tribe Madieae within the family Asteraceae.

Venegasia carpesioides is the only known species in the genus. It is shrubby bush growing to 1.8 m tall and prefers locations in moist canyons in southern California, and in Baja California. It is commonly known as the canyon sunflower.

Venegasia was named after the Mexican historian Miguel Venegas, 1680–1764.

References

External links
Jepson Manual Treatment
USDA Plants Profile
Flora of North America
Photo gallery

Madieae
Monotypic Asteraceae genera
Flora of California
Flora of Baja California